Yasuo Namekawa (born 23 March 1987), better known by his stage name Kangnam, is a Korean-Japanese singer and television personality who was the vocalist and oldest member of the South Korean hip-hop group M.I.B. He made his first recording in South Korea with the single "Say My Name" just before becoming a member of M.I.B.

Biography

Early life and career beginnings (1987–2010)
Kangnam was born on 23 March 1987 in Tokyo, Japan to a Korean mother and a Japanese father. As an only child, he spent most of his childhood in Japan and also spent some years in Hawaii. In March 2008, Kangnam appeared with the stage name Ya-Cha as a new member of the Japanese band Kick Chop Busters. However, he left the band in 2010 for unknown reasons, without his parents' knowledge. Kangnam has stated in interviews that his family is wealthy, but he does not receive financial support from them.

School life
Kangnam attended the Hawaiian Mission Academy in Honolulu for a brief period before transferring to another high school. He then returned to Japan to finish his studies. Kangnam briefly attended Temple University in Philadelphia, Pennsylvania, where he majored in Communications, but left the school to pursue music instead.

Career in South Korea (2011–present)
In South Korea, Kangnam first performed as a member of M.I.B under the Jungle Entertainment label on 25 October 2011, with the title track "G.D.M", which stands for "Girls, Dreams, Money". His solo song, "Say My Name", was released on 17 October 2011, as part of a spin-off promotion to prove that each member was capable of standing alone. Kangnam is an accomplished guitarist and pianist.

In 2012, Kangnam appeared in a TV advertisement for Epson, an electronics company that specializes in image-related products, and took on his first acting role in the TV sitcom 21st Century Family, and he became the host of the Japanese version of Mnet's Jjang.

In the 3 October 2014, episode of I Live Alone Rainbow segment, Kangnam revealed that he had only $3 in his bank account. In subsequent Entertainment Relay interviews, he reported that his income had increased significantly, as he became involved with more advertisements and variety shows. In October 2014, he became a permanent cast member of MBC's I Live Alone. In November 2014, he became an exclusive model for the shoe store ABC Mart, with model Nam Joo-hyuk.

Kangnam finally saw the fruit of his labours towards the end of 2014, when he was the presenter for a year-end festival stage as part of the "Lucky Boys" project for 2014 SBS Gayo Daejun. On the 26 December episode of MBC's I Live Alone, Kangnam spoke about attending year-end festivals for the first time since in his career: "Singers usually appear on TV to sing at the end of each year. Every year, I have been watching TV thinking 'I'll do that next year,' and somehow four years have passed."

On 26 December 2014, Kangnam released his second solo track, "What Do I Do", which wentsoared to #1 on Daum's real-time charts. Kangnam also ranked #1 on several real-time searches, including Naver, Melon and Mnet.

In February 2015, he was appointed the honorary ambassador for the fourth KCON music festival and convention for its first time in Japan and performed at the concert on 22 April. He has said that his fluency in both languages would allow him to "act as the bridge between the exchange of culture from both countries".

Solo career in Japan (2016)
Kangnam released his first Japanese solo album, Ready to Fly, on 25 May 2016, under CJ Victor Entertainment.

Personal life
On 16 March 2019, Kangnam's agency confirmed that he and the Olympic speed skater Lee Sang-hwa were dating. They got to know each other after appearing on the SBS variety show Law of the Jungle ("in Last Indian Ocean" part). On 11 August 2019, Kangnam announced his decision to forfeit his Japanese citizenship and began the process of becoming a naturalized Korean citizen.
Kangnam married Lee on 12 October 2019.

Kangnam officially became a South Korean citizen in February 2022.

Philanthropy 
On January 2, 2023, Kangnam donated 10 million won to a stray dog shelter.

Discography
For Kangnam's work with M.I.B, see M.I.B's discography.

Studio albums

Extended plays

Singles

Filmography

Television series

Web series

Television show

Web shows

Awards and nominations

References

External links 
 Official website

Singers from Tokyo
1987 births
Living people
Jungle Entertainment artists
CJ Victor Entertainment artists
Japanese-language singers
Japanese K-pop singers
South Korean male idols
Korean-language singers of Japan
Japanese people of Korean descent
Japanese expatriates in South Korea
21st-century Japanese singers
21st-century Japanese male singers